Alex Box Stadium, pronounced Alec Box Stadium, was a baseball stadium in Baton Rouge, Louisiana, United States. It was the home field of the LSU Tigers baseball team. The stadium was located across the street from Tiger Stadium, which is visible in right field.  It was most notable for The Intimidator, a large billboard behind the right-field fence featuring the five years in which LSU won the College World Series.

History
LSU constructed the ballpark at a cost of $50,000 in 1938. 

The New York Giants held spring training at the ballpark in 1938 and 1939. LSU dedicated the new field and the Giants played the first baseball game at the park on March 12, 1938, defeating the Philadelphia Phillies 6-5. 

The first LSU game was March 21, 1938. LSU led Minnesota, 4–2, after three innings when the game was halted due to rain. The first official LSU Game at the stadium was March 24, 1938, when Minnesota defeated LSU, 6–5.

Alex Box was home to the Baton Rouge Red Sticks in the Evangeline Baseball League from 1946 to 1955.

The final regular season series at Alex Box Stadium was played between LSU and Mississippi State University in 2008. At the time, it appeared this would be the last series ever at Alex Box Stadium; however, LSU was selected to host a regional in the NCAA Tournament (which it won), and subsequently hosted a Super Regional as the #7 national seed.

It appeared that Alex Box stadium would close on a sour note for the Tigers, as LSU dropped Game 1 to UC Irvine 11–5, and in Game 2, LSU was three outs away from elimination, trailing 7–4 in the ninth inning. However, UC Irvine was unable to close out the LSU Tigers and LSU came from behind to win the game 9–7.

The stadium was thus given one final chance to close on a high note, which it did in Game 3 of the Super Regional played on June 9, 2008, as LSU defeated UC Irvine 21–7. As a result of the victory, LSU won the Baton Rouge Super Regional two games to one and advanced to the College World Series in Omaha, Nebraska. In the final play at the stadium, Tyler Hoechlin hit a grounder to pitcher Anthony Ranaudo, who threw to first baseman Buzzy Haydel for the final out.

The stadium was dismantled, and its remnants sold to fans.

It was replaced with a new stadium 200 yards to the south named Alex Box Stadium, Skip Bertman Field. Both structures were named for Simeon Alex Box, an LSU letterman (1942) who was killed in North Africa during World War II. The stadium was called LSU Diamond or LSU Varsity Baseball Field when it first opened.

Tournaments Hosted 

NCAA Regional Tournaments (18): 1986, 1990, 1991, 1992, 1993, 1994, 1995, 1996, 1997, 1998, 1999, 2000, 2001, 2002, 2003, 2004, 2005, 2008
NCAA Super Regional Series (4): 2000, 2003, 2004, 2008
SEC Tournaments (4): 1985, 1986, 1991, 1993
ABCA Hall of Fame Tournament (1): 1991

LSU record in Alex Box Stadium (1984–2008)

References

External links 

 Alex Box Stadium at lsusports.net
 Digital ballparks: Alex Box Stadium

Baseball venues in Baton Rouge, Louisiana
LSU Tigers baseball venues
New York Giants (NL) spring training venues
Demolished sports venues in Louisiana
Defunct college baseball venues in the United States
1938 establishments in Louisiana
2008 disestablishments in Louisiana
Sports venues demolished in 2010
Sports venues completed in 1938